Michael Edward Welsh (April 20, 1971 – October 8, 2011) was an American artist and musician who played bass for several bands, including the rock band Weezer. During Weezer's hiatus, he played with Weezer frontman Rivers Cuomo in the band Homie, during Cuomo's time in Boston. Following original bassist Matt Sharp's departure from Weezer, Welsh joined as bassist and played with them from the time that they unofficially regrouped in 1998 until August 2001, when he experienced mental health problems. Shortly afterwards, he retired from music to focus on his art career. Welsh died from a drug overdose on October 8, 2011.

Career
Welsh was born on April 20, 1971 in Syracuse, New York. He began his career as a Boston-area musician, playing in bands such as Heretix, Chevy Heston, Jocobono, Left Nut, and Slower. He was a touring bassist for Juliana Hatfield and Verbena. In 1997, he joined the first incarnation of the Rivers Cuomo Band, the side-project of Weezer frontman Rivers Cuomo. He joined Weezer following the departure of Matt Sharp in 1998. 

During Weezer's hiatus, he played with Verbena and the first incarnation of Patrick Wilson's band the Special Goodness. He wrote a large number of basslines in this period, recorded them and sent them to Rivers Cuomo for writing inspiration, although Cuomo never used any of them. Instead, he contributed four of these to Juliana Hatfield's 2000 album Juliana's Pony: Total System Failure. Welsh was given a co-writing credit for four songs.

He toured with Weezer beginning with their resurgence in the summer of 2000 and first appeared on their limited edition Christmas CD EP later that year (re-released in 2005 as Winter Weezerland). He subsequently played on 2001's Green Album as well as a number of B-sides and unreleased songs from the era, and also performed with the band most of the way through tours supporting the album.

Mental illness and exit from Weezer
In 2001, Welsh suffered a breakdown brought on by drug use, undiagnosed mental health problems, and the strain of touring. After attempting suicide by drug overdose, he left Weezer. The reason for his exit was not made public until some time later. He was checked into a psychiatric hospital in August 2001. He later spoke about the ordeal in an interview with the website Rock Salt Plum: 

Weezer shot a new version of the video for their song "Island in the Sun" without Welsh. Following Welsh's departure in 2001, the band hired Scott Shriner to replace Welsh.

Retirement from music
In late 2001/2002, Welsh returned to the Boston music scene by temporarily joining the Kickovers, the band of Nate Albert, guitarist for the Mighty Mighty Bosstones. In an interview, he expressed his distaste for the corporate music process, stating that, "It's actually fun to just be playing in the studio without some major-label idiot standing over your shoulder." Soon after, he retired from music to become a full-time artist. He, his wife and their two sons lived in Vermont.

Welsh attended a Weezer show on July 12, 2005, in Lewiston, Maine. Cuomo dedicated "Hash Pipe" to him, drawing cheers from the crowd. On September 2, 2010, he joined the band on stage at a show in Essex Junction, Vermont to play bass on the song "Hash Pipe". On July 29, 2011, Welsh played guitar on the song "Undone" with Weezer and the Flaming Lips at a show in New York.

Art career
Welsh became an artist and, as of August 2008, had 13 exhibitions of his artwork. He was a member of Outsider Art.

A quote from Welsh's official website explained his methods of creating his art:

Welsh's artwork is featured on a Burton snowboard, in a line of snowboards titled "The Farm". He designed and painted the album cover for Twin Berlin's debut album.

Death
On September 26, 2011, Welsh wrote on Twitter: "dreamt i died in chicago next weekend (heart attack in my sleep). need to write my will today." On October 8, 2011, Welsh was found dead in a  Chicago hotel room from a suspected heroin overdose, leading to a heart attack.

Discography

Left Nut
 1990 – Bad Attitude No Apologies

Heretix
 1993 – The Adventures of Superdevil

Jocobono
 1995 – Jocobono

Juliana Hatfield
 1997 – Please Do Not Disturb
 1998 – Bed
 2000 – Juliana's Pony: Total System Failure
 2002 – Gold Stars 1992–2002: The Juliana Hatfield Collection

Weezer
 2000 – Christmas CD
 2001 – Weezer

The Kickovers
 2002 – Osaka

References

External links

1971 births
2011 deaths
20th-century American musicians
21st-century American musicians
Alternative rock bass guitarists
American alternative rock musicians
American rock bass guitarists
American male bass guitarists
Death in Illinois
Musicians from Syracuse, New York
Outsider art
Artists from Syracuse, New York
People with bipolar disorder
People with borderline personality disorder
Weezer members
Guitarists from New York (state)
The Special Goodness members